John Bickley was Member of the Parliament of England for Huntingdon in 1415 and 1426.

References

Year of birth missing
Year of death missing
English MPs 1415
English MPs 1426